This is a list of Old Rajans, they being the alumni of Dharmaraja College, Kandy, Sri Lanka.

See also
Dharmaraja College

References

External links
 Complete list and personal pages of Dharmaraja College alumni

 
Dharmaraja College